Historic Mill Creek Discovery Park, formerly known as Historic Mill Creek State Park is a state park, nature preserve, and historic site in the United States state of Michigan.  It is run by Mackinac State Historic Parks, the operating arm of the Mackinac Island State Park.  625 acres (2.5 km²) in size, the park is located 5 miles (8 km) southeast of Mackinaw City, Michigan on U.S. Highway 23.

History
The original sawmill at Mill Creek operated from about 1790 until 1839.  It was originally built by Robert Campbell to supply lumber to the Straits of Mackinac, especially the frontier settlement of Mackinac Island. In 1793 it contracted with Fort Mackinac to make repairs on the soldiers' barracks.  The Mill Creek sawmill enjoyed a dominant market share of the supply of cut timbers in the Straits of Mackinac during the fur trade era, and a millwright's house was built about 1820 near the sawmill to provide a place for the mill operator to live.  In 1819, Michael Dousman purchased the mill site and continued to operate it.  However, global demand for beaver fur declined in the 1830s, and  following Dousman's death in 1839 the sawmill and millwright's house were abandoned.

After the sawmill's abandonment in 1839, the original sawmill complex buildings rotted and disappeared.  However, timbers cut by the original mill survived in buildings on Mackinac Island (Mission Church and Mission House, built in the 1820s and still there today). Saw marks on these timbers could be used to reconstruct the mill machinery so as to closely resemble the original. The marks gave restoration experts information on the rake of the saw's teeth and the saw's operating speed.  The wood is fed into the blade at 1/3 of an inch per stroke, and the infeed motion is powered by the pitman arm that powers the saw's vertical movement.

Archaeological investigations were conducted at the site of the sawmill in the 1970s.  The dig site was variously called  the "Filbert Site," the "Mill Creek Site," or the "Campbell Farm Site," and was designated 20cn8.

Mill Creek today
Mill Creek drains the Dingman Marsh, a perched wetland within Mackinaw State Forest in northwest Cheboygan County.  The Discovery Park includes approximately 1 mile (1.6 km) of the eponymous creek's watercourse as it flows downhill toward Lake Huron, but not the wetland.  The creek dam and sawmill (c. 1790) were rebuilt in 1984; the sawmill was restored in part for the 2007 season.  The British Workshop (c. 1820) was rebuilt around 1994 on the site of the original.  The millwright's house (c. 1820) was rebuilt in 2005.  As of 2008, the park had  of nature trails, with a small portion handicapped-accessible.

In summers, costumed interpreters use antique woodworking tools to make shingles, and demonstrate a variety of other tasks common in the 1820s, and demonstrate the operation of the sawpit and sawmill.  A naturalist conducts talks on the animal and plant species of the nearby forested areas.

The North Central State Trail serves Historic Mill Creek State Park.

References

External links
Historic Mill Creek Discovery Park
Historic Mill Creek Discovery Park - Mackinac Island State Park Commission
Historic Mill Creek Discovery Park - Michigan Department of Natural Resources

Industrial buildings and structures on the National Register of Historic Places in Michigan
Industry museums in Michigan
Living museums in Michigan
Michigan State Historic Sites
Mill museums in the United States
Museums in Cheboygan County, Michigan
National Register of Historic Places in Cheboygan County, Michigan
Protected areas of Cheboygan County, Michigan
State parks of Michigan